Rhaeticosaurus (meaning 'Rhaetian lizard') is an extinct genus of basal pliosauroid from the Late Triassic (Rhaetian) rocks of the Exter Formation. The type and only species, Rhaeticosaurus mertensi, was named by Wintrich et al. in 2017. It is known from a partial articulated skeleton.

It was acquired by an anonymous private collector, who notified authorities and the specimen was eventually prepared and named as Rhaeticosaurus mertensi in 2017. 

Based on the holotype, Rhaeticosaurus grew up to  when fully grown.

References 

Triassic plesiosaurs
Sauropterygian genera
Fossil taxa described in 2017